Mulrooney is a surname of Irish origin. The name may refer to:
 Belinda Mulrooney (1872–1967), Irish-American entrepreneur who made a fortune in the Klondike Gold Rush
 John Mulrooney (contemporary), American comedian, actor, and television host
 Richard Mulrooney (b. 1976), American major league soccer player

See also
 Mulroney